Muhammad Asif Mohseni (26 April 1935 – 5 August 2019) was an Afghan Twelver Shi'a Marja', widely considered to be the most powerful in Afghanistan. He was the founder of the Islamic Movement of Afghanistan.

Early life and education
He was born on 26 April 1935 in the city of Qandahār, Afghanistan.

With strong links to Iran, he was a Shi'a Pashtun. He studied in seminars of Najaf under Grand Ayatollah Abul Qasim Khoei, Muhsin al-Hakim and Abdul A'la Sabzwari.

Shi'a Family Law
In 2009, Mohseni drafted a family law code for Afghanistan's minority Shi'a population. The Shi'a Family Law legislation was signed into law by President Hamid Karzai in March 2009 after intense pressure from Shi'a clerics including Mohseni and some leaders of the Hazara community. It gives Shi’ite men in Afghanistan wide-ranging powers over their wives. Shi’ite women must obtain permission from their husbands to leave their houses, “except in extreme circumstances.” The law also grants guardianship of children exclusively to their fathers and grandfathers.

The passing of the law brought international outrage and was condemned by world leaders including US President Barack Obama. A report by the United Nations Development Fund for Women, UNIFEM, warned: "Article 132 legalises the rape of a wife by her husband".

On 15 April 2009, between 200 and 300 Afghan women protested against the law outside Mohseni's mosque and seminary. They were met by hundreds of his enraged supporters who shouted abuse and, according to many of the demonstrators, threw stones at the women. The night before the demonstration, a television station owned by Mohseni repeatedly broadcast a message advising people to prevent family members attending the protest.

The law was eventually amended before implementation in August 2009, such as the modification of some of the rules that were protested against. However some have commented that the law remains repressive.

Religious, political, and business organisations
Mohseni owned Tamadon TV, a television network very similar in visual style and religious content to Iranian state-run television channels.

In the 1960s Mohseni founded a movement called Subh-i Danish (Dawn of Knowledge), whose political and cultural revival program enjoyed some popularity among the Shi'a youth of Kabul.

In 1978 he founded the Islamic Movement of Afghanistan (Harakat-I Islami-yi Afghanistan), a Shi'a anti-Soviet resistance movement and political party combining various smaller groups with numerous bases inside and outside the country. Its headquarters was originally in the Iranian city of Qum and Mohseni received support for the group from the Iranian state. The group later played an important role in the 1980 rebellion against the communist regime. Among the anti-communist resistance movements, Harakat espoused a moderate islamist line, which brought it close to the sunni Jamiat Islami faction, that had a similar outlook. Mohseni's movement resisted from different Afghan cities and his forces included mainly Mujahideen.

Death
Mohseni died on August 5, 2019, in Kabul, Afghanistan. He was buried on August 6, 2019, in the building of the Hawzah Ilmiyah Khatam al-Nabiyin in Kabul.

Works
Buhuth fi 'ilm al-rijal it contains principles of rijal, and according to Mahdi Mehrizi, it is an enduring book about dirayat al-hadith

Mashra'a bihar al-anwar it is a commentary on Bihar al-anwar, in which he tries to separate out reliable hadiths from unreliable ones in Bihar al-anwar in accordance to his own principles of rijal as elaborated in his Buhuth fi 'ilm al-rijal. He discusses different issues in reliable hadiths

Aqa'id baray-i hami (religious beliefs for everyone)

Taqrib-i madhahib, az nazar ta 'amal (proximity among denominations, from theory to practice)

Zan dar shari'at-i islami (woman in the Islamic sharia)

Tawdih al-masa'il-i siyasi (essay of political fatwas)

Khasa'is khatam al-nabiyyin (characteristics of the last prophet).

References

1935 births
2019 deaths
Afghan Shia Muslims
Afghan grand ayatollahs
People from Kandahar
Pashtun people
Mujahideen members of the Soviet–Afghan War
Biographical evaluation scholars